Andras Farago (András Faragó) is Professor of Computer Science at The University of Texas at Dallas. Before joining The University of Texas at Dallas he was Professor at the Department of Telecommunications and Telematics at the Technical University of Budapest, Hungary.

Education 
Andras Farago received his B.Sc. in Electrical Engineering from the Technical University of Budapest in 1976. He received his M.Sc from the Technical University of Budapest in 1979. He then earned his Ph.D. in Electrical Engineering at the Technical University of Budapest in 1981. In 1996 he obtained the distinguished title "Doctor of Sciences" from the Hungarian Academy of Sciences.

Career 
Before moving to the US in 1998, he worked as a visiting Senior Research Fellow at the University of Massachusetts from 1991 to 1992. In 1996, he spent a sabbatical year at Boston University. Until 1997, he was with the Department of Telecommunications and Telematics, Technical University of Budapest. There, he co-founded the High Speed Networks Laboratory, a leading telecom research laboratory in the region.

Since 1998, Farago is working as a professor of Computer Science at the Erik Jonsson School of Engineering and Computer Science, University of Texas at Dallas.

His research has a focus on algorithm, optimization and design problems in communication networks. He also works on wireless network architectures and protocols, topology control, scalability analysis and in high speed networks and protocols.

References 

Living people
Budapest University of Technology and Economics alumni
Academic staff of the Budapest University of Technology and Economics
Hungarian computer scientists
Senior Members of the IEEE
University of Texas at Dallas faculty
Year of birth missing (living people)